The Green Zone Cafe was a restaurant in the northeast corner of the Green Zone (International Zone) in Baghdad, Iraq. The restaurant was housed in a fabric and metal-frame building established in the parking lot of a former filling station. It was a popular and successful business, primarily serving the Western inhabitants of the Green Zone and featuring Arab cuisine.

On October 14, 2004, the restaurant was destroyed, one patron was killed, and five wounded by a backpack bomb. The restaurant reopened briefly a year later, along with a liquor store that was primarily patronized by security contractors in October 2005, but was closed when the Iraqi government confiscated the property.

External links
 (September 20, 2004). Lost In The Green Zone Newsweek/MSNBC.
 (October 14, 2004). Five dead in Baghdad green zone blasts Guardian Unlimited.
 (October 14, 2004). U.S. Condemns Deadly Terrorist Bombings in Baghdad October 14 United States Embassy

Buildings and structures in Baghdad
Restaurants in Iraq
Terrorist incidents in Asia in 2004
2004 murders in Iraq
Bombings in the Iraqi insurgency
Building bombings in Iraq